8th New York Film Critics Circle Awards
January ?, 1943(announced December 26, 1942)

In Which We Serve

The 8th New York Film Critics Circle Awards, announced on 26 December 1942, honored the best filmmaking of 1942.

Winners
Best Film:
In Which We Serve
Best Actor:
James Cagney - Yankee Doodle Dandy
Best Actress:
Agnes Moorehead - The Magnificent Ambersons
Best Director:
John Farrow - Wake Island
Best War Fact Film:
Moscow Strikes Back

References

External links
1942 Awards

1942
New York Film Critics Circle Awards, 1942
1942 in American cinema
1942 in New York City